Valerie Stanfill (born 1957/1958) is an American judge who serves as the chief justice of the Maine Supreme Judicial Court. She is a former Associate Justice of the Maine Superior Court.

Education 
Stanfill received her Bachelor of Arts from Bryn Mawr College in 1979 and her Juris Doctor from the University of Maine School of Law in 1985.

Career 

Prior to becoming a judge, Stanfill worked as acting director of the Cumberland Legal Aid Clinic and as a visiting professor of law for the University of Maine School of Law.

Stanfill was first nominated to the district court by Governor John Baldacci and she was renominated by Governor Paul LePage on February 7, 2014, and sworn in on March 19, 2014. She served as a judge of the Maine District Court from January 2007 to February 2020. On December 3, 2019, she was nominated to the Maine Superior Court by Governor Janet Mills and has served on that court since February 2020. On May 10, 2021, Governor Mills nominated Stanfill to be the chief justice of the Maine Supreme Judicial Court to fill the vacancy left by the retirement of Chief Justice Leigh Saufley. If confirmed, she would be the second woman to serve as chief justice. On June 1, 2021, her nomination was unanimously voted out of committee. On June 3, 2021, the committee endorsement was upheld by the full Senate, thereby confirming Stanfill, by a vote of 0–34. She was sworn in on June 8, 2021.

References

External links 

1950s births
Living people
20th-century American women lawyers
20th-century American lawyers
21st-century American judges
21st-century American women lawyers
21st-century American lawyers
Bryn Mawr College alumni
Chief Justices of the Maine Supreme Judicial Court
Maine lawyers
Maine state court judges
People from Wayne, Maine
Superior court judges in the United States
University of Maine School of Law alumni
University of Maine School of Law faculty
Women chief justices of state supreme courts in the United States
21st-century American women judges